The 2015 African U-20 Women's World Cup Qualifying Tournament was the 8th edition of the African U-20 Women's World Cup Qualifying Tournament, the biennial international youth football competition organised by the Confederation of African Football (CAF) to determine which women's under-20 national teams from Africa qualify for the FIFA U-20 Women's World Cup. Players born on or after 1 January 1996 were eligible to compete in the tournament.

The top two teams of the tournament qualified for the 2016 FIFA U-20 Women's World Cup in Papua New Guinea as the CAF representatives.

Ghana and Nigeria qualified for the World Cup like in the last three editions.

Teams
A total of 19 CAF member national teams entered the qualifying rounds.

Format
Qualification ties were played on a home-and-away two-legged basis. If the aggregate score was tied after the second leg, the away goals rule would be applied, and if still level, the penalty shoot-out would be used to determine the winner (no extra time would be played).

The two winners of the third round qualified for the FIFA U-20 Women's World Cup.

Schedule
The schedule of the qualifying rounds was as follows.

Preliminary round

|}

Note: Sierra Leone withdrew. First leg of DR Congo v Gabon was postponed to 9 May due to field problems, then to 16 May due to Gabon missing the flight.

Burkina Faso won 7–0 on aggregate.

DR Congo won 6–0 on aggregate.

Liberia won on walkover.

First round

|}

Note: Order of legs between Liberia and Nigeria reversed from original fixtures.

Burkina Faso won 3–2 on aggregate.

Ethiopia won 2–1 on aggregate.

Equatorial Guinea won 4–0 on aggregate.

Ghana won 8–0 on aggregate.

DR Congo won 5–0 on aggregate.

Nigeria won 14–1 on aggregate.

Zambia won 4–0 on aggregate.

South Africa won 9–1 on aggregate.

Second round

|}

Note: First leg of Burkina Faso v Ethiopia was postponed to 3 October, then to 10 October, due to coup in Burkina Faso.

Ethiopia won 2–0 on aggregate.

Ghana won 3–0 on aggregate.

Nigeria won 4–1 on aggregate.

South Africa won 3–2 on aggregate.

Third round
Winners qualified for 2016 FIFA U-20 Women's World Cup.

|}

Ghana won 6–2 on aggregate.

Nigeria won 3–1 on aggregate.

Qualified teams for FIFA U-20 Women's World Cup
The following two teams from CAF qualified for the FIFA U-20 Women's World Cup.

1 Bold indicates champion for that year. Italic indicates host for that year.

Goalscorers
6 goals

 Loza Abera
 Chinwendu Ihezuo

5 goals
 Joëlle Mwadi

4 goals

 Sandra Owusu-Ansah
 Yetunde Adeboyejo

3 goals

 Barkissa Sawadogo
 Hornella Lengi Salu
 Princella Adubea
 Jane Ayieyam
 Amarachi Ojinma
 Gabriela Salgado
 Linda Motlhalo

2 goals

 Mariam Fifao Traoré
 Lily Niber-Lawrence
 Yoy Bokiri
 Chinaza Uchendu
 Amina Yakubu
 Chrestinah Kgatlana
 Anelisa Ndyebi
 Barbara Banda

1 goal

 Naima Lamari
 Baya Meskari
 Refilwe Mathlo
 Mouniratou Compaoré
 Assifou Coulibaly
 Chantal Drabo
 Yasmine Ouattara
 Stéphanie Sow
 Catherine Mbengono
 Nathalie Boyengwa
 Merveille Mbemba Makiese
 Emeraude Mawanda Muyenga
 Flavie Mawete
 Muriellynda Abossolo
 Olga Esono
 Francisca Ondo
 Isabel Nsang
 Kate Addo
 Fatima Alhassan
 Veronica Appiah
 Wasila Diwura-Soale
 Kanties Sayee
 Chinozo Sunday
 Mosili Makhoali
 Nomathansanqa Sikweza
 Chamelle Wiltshire
 Ireen Lungu
 Agnes Musesa
 Memory Phiri
 Marry Wilombe

Own goal

 Hassabi Muso (playing against Ghana)
 Caryn van Reyneveld (playing against Nigeria)

References

External links
2016 FIFA U-20 Women's World Cup – Qualifiers, CAFonline.com

2015
Women's U-20 World Cup Qualifying Tournament
African U-20 World Cup Qualifying Tournament
2015 in youth association football